Meloria south end Lighthouse is an active lighthouse located in the Ligurian Sea,  west of the south entrance of the Port of Livorno, in the southern part of the Meloria shoal.

Description
The light is operated by the Marina Militare and it is identified by the code number 1888 E.F.

See also
 List of lighthouses in Italy
 Meloria north end Lighthouse

References

External links 

 Servizio Fari Marina Militare 

Lighthouses in Italy
Lighthouses in Tuscany